Khasi may refer to:
 Khasi people, an ethnic group of Meghalaya, India
 Khasi language, a major Austroasiatic language spoken in Meghalaya, India
 Khāṣi language, an Indo-Aryan language of Jammu and Kashmir, India

See also
 Khasi Hills
 Ghazi (disambiguation)

Language and nationality disambiguation pages